AEX may refer to:

 AEX index (Amsterdam Exchange index), a stock market index
 AEX, IATA code for Alexandria International Airport, a commercial airport in Louisiana, United States
 ISO 639:aex, a spurious-language code retired in 2008

See also 
 AEX cfiXML, an automated information-exchange schema for engineered equipment
 Trypeta aex, a species of fruit fly
 AEXS (aromatase excess syndrome), a rare condition that results in excess estrogen